Choking Hazard is a 2004 Czech comedy-horror film by Marek Dobeš.

https://www.holesov.cz/352-marek-dobes-chtel-jsem-aby-byl-zamek-prezentovan-citlive.html

https://.www.alfedus.cz/

  Marek Dobeš

Plot

Production 
Chocking Hazard was reported to be in production during February 2004.

Reception 
Eddie Cockrell of Variety wrote, "Marek Dobes keeps cheeky fun at the fore, with buckets of raspberry-hued gore fleshing out odd rhythms of double-take comedy."  Writing in The Zombie Movie Encyclopedia, Volume 2, academic Peter Dendle said, "Many profound thoughts fly around in the light-hearted camp feature ... The script has a good time poking fun at academic philosophy and trendy religions alike".

References

External links 
 
 
 
 

2004 comedy horror films
2004 films
Czech comedy horror films
2000s Czech-language films
Zombie comedy films
2000s Czech films
Czech zombie films